Text-to-911 is a technology that enables emergency call takers to receive text messages. Its use is encouraged for people with hearing impairment or who have trouble speaking; it can also be used for situations when it is too dangerous to call. Text-to-911 has been supported by the four major cellular providers in the United States since 2014, but  it is only supported by approximately 1,600 of more than 6,000 emergency call centers.

Adoption 
The FCC maintains a registry of areas supporting text-to-911. All carriers are required to send bounce-back messages to inform the sender that the message could not be received if text-to-911 is not supported by the local call center.

Statewide Support 
Arizona
 Connecticut
 Delaware
 Indiana
 Iowa
 Minnesota
 Maine
 New Hampshire
 North Dakota
 South Dakota
The National Association of the Deaf provides a map of states providing text-to-911.

Challenges 
Call centers are usually funded by both state and federal funding. Limited funding and outdated technology have slowed the adoption of text-to-911. Voice-based calls are still preferred and considered the more efficient form of communication. Many cities are concerned about overuse of texting, which may slow response times. Texts to 911 are not prioritized so they may be slow to be delivered.

History 
In August 2009, Waterloo, Iowa, was the first county to begin receiving texts to 911.

See also 
 3-1-1, non-emergency number
 9-1-1 Tapping Protocol
 Emergency medical dispatcher
 Enhanced 9-1-1
 Next Generation 9-1-1
 Reverse 9-1-1

References

External links 

 FCC registry of areas that support Text-to-9-1-1 services

Assistive technology
Emergency telephone numbers
Emergency communication